Events from the year 1585 in the Dutch Republic

Events

 - Battle of Empel
 - Siege of IJsseloord
 - Treaty of Nonsuch

Births

Deaths

References

1585 in the Dutch Republic
1580s in the Dutch Republic
Years of the 16th century in the Dutch Republic